Erik Hoftun (born 3 March 1969) is a Norwegian former footballer who played as a defender.

Career
Born in Kyrksæterøra, Hoftun started his career at KIL/Hemne before moving to Molde FK in 1992. He went to Rosenborg BK in 1994, where he won 11 league titles and 3 cup titles in 11 years. Hoftun was a key player for Rosenborg in the Norwegian league and the UEFA Champions League, where he played a total of 82 matches.

At his peak, Hoftun was arguably one of the best central defenders in Scandinavia, with superb anticipation and offensive qualities. His lack of speed was his one major weakness, though he usually managed to mask it through footballing experience and understanding of the game. For Norway's national team, he has been capped 30 times. In a 2004 issue of the official UEFA Champions League publication, Champions Magazine, Hoftun was ranked as no. 86 in a list of the 250 greatest European football players of all time. The jury's comment on Hoftun read:

In 2005, Hoftun moved to FK Bodø/Glimt, where he finished his career as an active football player. On 24 June 2007, while playing a match for Bodø/Glimt, Hoftun suffered from cardiac arrest after getting a knee in the chest in a duel. The club's doctor ran onto the pitch to revive him. The doctor's fast reaction is likely to have saved Hoftun's life.

In November 2007, Hoftun returned to Rosenborg in an administrative role, and worked as assistant director after Knut Torbjørn Eggen resigned. On 18 August 2008, he got the position permanently.

Honours

Club
Norwegian top division: 1994, 1995, 1996, 1997, 1998, 1999, 2000, 2001, 2002, 2003, 2004
Norwegian Cup: 1995, 1999, 2003

Individual
Kniksen award as defender of the year: 1995, 1996, 1997, 1998, 1999, 2000

References

1969 births
Living people
Kniksen Award winners
Norwegian footballers
Norway international footballers
Rosenborg BK players
Molde FK players
FK Bodø/Glimt players
Eliteserien players
1998 FIFA World Cup players
People from Hemne
Rosenborg BK non-playing staff
Association football central defenders
Sportspeople from Trøndelag